Sir Philip Armand Hamilton Gibbs KBE (1 May 1877 – 10 March 1962) was an English journalist and prolific author of books who served as one of five official British reporters during the First World War. Four of his siblings were also writers, A. Hamilton Gibbs, Francis Hamilton Gibbs, Helen Hamilton Gibbs, and Cosmo Hamilton, as was his father Henry James Gibbs, and his own son, Anthony.

Early life
The son of a civil servant, Gibbs was born in Kensington, London, his name then being registered as Philip Amande Thomas.  He received a home education and determined at an early age to develop a career as a writer. Gibbs was a Roman Catholic.

Career
His debut article was published in 1894 in the Daily Chronicle; five years later he published the first of many books, Founders of the Empire. He was given the post of literary editor at Alfred Harmsworth's leading (and growing) tabloid format newspaper the Daily Mail. He subsequently worked on other prominent newspapers including the Daily Express.

The Times, in 1940 referring to 1909, credited Gibbs for "bursting the bubble with one cable to the London newspaper he was representing". The bubble in question was the September 1909 claim by American explorer Frederick Cook to have reached the North Pole in April 1908. Gibbs didn't trust Cook's "romantic" impressions of his journey into the ice.

His first attempt at semi-fiction was published in 1909 as The Street of Adventure, which recounted the story of the official Liberal Party newspaper Tribune, founded in 1906 and failing spectacularly in 1908. The paper was founded at vast expense by Franklin Thomasson, MP for Leicester from 1906-10. A man of decidedly liberal views, Gibbs took an interest in popular movements of the time, including the suffragettes, publishing a book on the British women's suffrage movement in 1910. With tensions growing in Europe in the years immediately preceding 1914, Gibbs repeatedly expressed a belief that war could be avoided between the Entente and Central Powers.  In the event, war broke out in August 1914 and Gibbs secured an early journalistic posting to the Western Front. 

He wrote about the Mines in the Battle of Messines (1917): 

It was not long before the War Office in London resolved to "manage" popular information about the war, partly by censorship of war reporting. Gibbs was denied permission to remain on the Western Front; he stubbornly refused to return but was duly arrested and sent home. 

Gibbs was not long out of official favour, however. Along with four other men he was officially accredited as a war correspondent, his work appearing in the Daily Telegraph and Daily Chronicle.  The price he had to pay for accreditation was to submit to effective censorship: all of his work was to be vetted by C. E. Montague, formerly of the Manchester Guardian. He agreed, although unhappy with the arrangement. Gibbs' wartime output was prodigious.  He produced a stream of newspaper articles and a series of books: The Soul of the War (1915), The Battle of the Somme (1917), From Bapaume to Passchendaele (1918) and The Realities of War (UK title, 1920; "Now it Can Be Told", United States title, 1920). Gibbs' work in the immediate post-war period was focused on a fear of societal unrest created by brutalised  ‘ape-men’ and wartime-employed women who 'were clinging onto their jobs, would not let go of the pocket-money which they had spent on frocks’. He was awarded KBE in the 1920 civilian war honours.

In The Realities of War Gibbs exacted a form of revenge for the frustration he suffered in submitting to wartime censorship; published after the armistice, the book gave an account of his personal experiences in war-torn Europe, painting a most unflattering portrait of Sir Douglas Haig, British Commander-in-Chief in France and Flanders, and his General Headquarters.

Gibbs' post-war career continued to be as varied as ever.  Embarking shortly after the war upon a lecture tour of the U.S. he also secured the first journalistic interview with a Pope. 

Working as a freelance journalist, having resigned from the Daily Chronicle over its support for the Lloyd George government's Irish policy,  he published a series of books and articles, including an autobiography, Adventures in Journalism (1923).

Gibbs' 1937 book Ordeal In England was a study of poverty and also an anti-socialist critique of English Journey by J. B. Priestley and The Road to Wigan Pier by George Orwell. Ordeal In England was later republished by the conservative Right Book Club.

The outbreak of the Second World War in 1939 brought Gibbs a renewed appointment as a war correspondent, this time for the Daily Sketch.  This proved a brief stint however and he spent part of the war employed by the Ministry of Information, the department responsible for publicity and propaganda, which the British government re-established in September 1939. In 1946 he published a second volume of memoirs, The Pageant of the Years. Two further volumes followed in 1949 and 1957, Crowded Company and Life's Adventure.

Death
Gibbs died at Godalming, in the county of Surrey on 10 March 1962.

Works
A list of books by Gibbs.

 Across the Frontiers
 
 America Speaks
 An Historical Account Of Compendious and Swift Writing
 
 Beauty and Nick
 Behind the Curtain
 Blood Relations
 Both Your Houses
 
 Broken Pledges
 Called Back
 Cities Of Refuge
 Crowded Company
 Darkened Rooms
 England Speaks
 European Journey
 Facts and Ideas: Short Studies Of Life and Literature
 Founders Of the Empire
 
 Great Argument
 Heirs Apparent
 How Now England
 Knowledge Is Power
 Lady Of the Yellow River
 Life's Adventure
 
 
 No Price For Freedom
 
 Oil Lamps and Candlelight
 Ordeal In England
 People Of Destiny
 
 Since Then
 Sons Of the Others
 Ten Years After
 The Age Of Reason
 The Anxious Days
 
 The Battle Within

 
 The Cloud Above the Green
 The Cross Of Peace
 The Curtains Of Yesterday
 The Day After To-Morrow
 The Eighth Year
 The Germans On the Somme
 The Golden Years
 The Healing Touch
 The Hidden City
 The Hope Of Europe
 The Hopeful Heart
 The Individualist
 The Interpreter
 The Journalist's London
 The Law-Breakers
 The Life and Times Of King George V: George the Faithful
 The Long Alert
 
 The Pageant Of the Years
 The Pilgrim's Progress To Culture
 The Reckless Duke
 The Reckless Lady
 The Riddle Of a Changing World
 The Romance Of Empire
 
 
 The Spoils Of Time
 
 
 
 
 The Winding Lane
 Thine Enemy
 This Nettle Danger
 Through the Storm
 Unchanging Quest
 Wounded Souls
 Young Anarchy

Film adaptations
Several of his books were adapted as movies.

 1921, The Street of Adventure 
 1925, Venetian Lovers
 1925, The City of Temptation
 1926, High Steppers, based on the novel Heirs Apparent 1926, The Reckless Lady 1928, Paradise, based on The Crossword Puzzle 1928, Out of the Ruins 1929, Darkened Rooms 1933, Captured!, based on the story "Fellow Prisoners"

References

Further reading
 Twentieth Century Authors: A Biographical Dictionary of Modern Literature'', edited by Stanley J. Kunitz and Howard Haycraft, New York, H. W. Wilson Company, 1942.

External links

 
 
 
 
 Portraits of Philip Gibbs in the National Portrait Gallery, London (Photographs Collection 31 hits, Reference Collection 1)
 
 

1877 births
1962 deaths
English male journalists
20th-century English novelists
War correspondents of World War I
English Roman Catholics
Writers from London
Knights Commander of the Order of the British Empire
English male novelists
20th-century English male writers